Chris Tally Evans is a Welsh disabled artist, actor, director, and writer. He trained at the Royal Welsh College of Music and Drama as a performer and graduated from Trinity College, London, with a teaching diploma.

Career
Evans' interest in theatre and music started as a teenager when he joined West Glamorgan Youth Theatre and West Glamorgan Youth Arts Company as an actor, dancer and musician. He was lead guitarist for the West Glamorgan Youth Arts Company production of Leonard Bernstein's "Mass" at Swansea's Brangwyn Hall and London's Wembley Arena and was a dancer in Vaughan Williams' "Job" at a performance attended by the Prince and Princess of Wales in 1981. In both these productions he shared the stage with Russell T Davies, writer and producer of Doctor Who. By the age of 14 he was playing the guitar semi-professionally in pubs and clubs in the Swansea area, as well as for a number of theatre shows. For two years at this time he was lead guitarist in the backing band of a very young Catherine Zeta-Jones. Later Evans played in a number of bands including the electric folk band Straight From the Wood who chalked up memorable appearances at Club Ifor Bach, Cardiff, Gwyl Pontardawe Festival and the Village Pump Folk Festival in Trowbridge. Evans has had both poetry and prose published, directed many theatre productions and has performed himself in the United States, Canada, Poland and New Zealand. His film work was exhibited at the John F. Kennedy Center for the Performing Arts, Washington, DC, in 2011.

The Arts Council of Wales granted Evans a Major Creative Wales Award in 2009 and he performed work created at this time at the InterACT Disability Arts Festival in Auckland, New Zealand. His unlimited commission, Turning Points, was shown in the Southbank Centre, London during the 2012 Paralympic Games and then went on to be exhibited in Doha, Qatar, in 2013 as part of the Middle East's first ever disability arts festival. He has featured in HTV's award-winning documentary, One in Six and on BBC 2W's The Arts Show. Evans presented In Search of Captain Cat for BBC Radio Wales in 2022 and wrote and performed a five-part series for BBC Radio 4 called My Mile of the River. His March 2014 production, 21st Century Dinosaurs, with a visually impaired cast, was reviewed favourably by Sarah Finch of National Theatre Wales. He wrote, performed and made video content for National Theatre Wales/Celf o Gwmpas' Big Democracy Project which responded to the question "Are disabled people an easy target for the cuts?" in June 2015. In 2015 he was appointed a National Adviser to the Arts Council of Wales.

References

21st-century male artists
21st-century Welsh artists
21st-century Welsh male actors
Actors with disabilities
Artists with disabilities
Living people
Place of birth missing (living people)
Welsh poets
Welsh writers
Year of birth missing (living people)